James Martin's Saturday Morning is a British television program aired on ITV presented by James Martin. On Saturday 28 May 2022, Martin presented the 200th episode of the show with special guests model David Gandy, comedian Johnny Vegas and chefs Clare Smyth, Daniel Clifford and Sat Bains.

Series overview

Featured chefs
Some of the chefs to join James Martin run two- and three-Michelin star restaurants, including: Sat Bains, Tom Kerridge, and Clare Smyth.

Also among the chefs to join Martin are chefs from his time on Ready Steady Cook. Among them: Nick Nairn and Paul Rankin, Tony Tobin and Brian Turner.

References

2017 British television series debuts
2010s British television series
2020s British television series
English-language television shows
ITV (TV network) original programming